Messier 93 or M93, also known as NGC 2447, is an open cluster in the modestly southern constellation Puppis, the imagined poop deck of the legendary Argo.

Observational history and appearance
It was discovered by Charles Messier then added to his catalogue of comet-like objects in 1781. Caroline Herschel, the younger sister of William Herschel, independently discovered it in 1783, thinking it had not yet been catalogued by Messier. 

Walter Scott Houston (died 1993) described its appearance:
Some observers mention the cluster as having the shape of a starfish. With a fair-sized telescope, this is its appearance on a dull night, but [a four-inch refractor] shows it as a typical star-studded galactic cluster.

Properties

Its age is estimated at 387.3 million years.

Fifty-four variable stars have been found in M93, including one slowly pulsating B-type star, one rotating ellipsoidal variable, seven Delta Scuti variables, six Gamma Doradus variables, and one hybrid δ Sct/γ Dor pulsator. Four spectroscopic binary systems within include a yellow straggler component.

Gallery

See also
 List of Messier objects

References

External links

 SEDS: Open Star Cluster M93
 
 

Messier 093
Orion–Cygnus Arm
Messier 093
093
Messier 093
Astronomical objects discovered in 1781
Discoveries by Charles Messier